Farleton is a village and former civil parish, now in the parish of Beetham, in the South Lakeland local government district, Cumbria, England. In 1931 the parish had a population of 67.

Farleton used to have one public house called 'the Duke' after the Grand Old Duke of York but this was turned into a dwelling house in the early part of the twentieth century. With Farleton there is a small river and one post box. There is also a limestone kiln and the remains of a limestone quarry.

Farleton was formerly a township in Beetham parish, from 1866 Farleton was a civil parish in its own right until it was abolished on 1 April 1935 and merged with Beetham.

See also

Listed buildings in Beetham

References

External links 
 Cumbria County History Trust: Farleton (nb: provisional research only – see Talk page)

Villages in Cumbria
Former civil parishes in Cumbria
Beetham